Boczki  is a village in the administrative district of Gmina Szadek, within Zduńska Wola County, Łódź Voivodeship, in central Poland.

Notable residents
Wilhelm Marceli Nencki (1847–1901), chemist and doctor

References

Villages in Zduńska Wola County